Via Dolorosa is a street in the Old City of Jerusalem which is traditionally held to be the path Jesus walked on the way to his Crucifixion. 

By extension, the term is also used, infrequently, to refer to a road or series of roads connecting memorials to the dead, especially war memorials.

Via Dolorosa''' may also refer to:
Via Dolorosa (play), a Broadway play by David Hare
Via Dolorosa (album), an album by Ophthalamia
"Via Dolorosa" (song), a song by Sandi Patty from Songs from the Heart "Via Dolorsa", a song by Matthew Good from Arrows of Desire''